The Cape 31 is a 31 foot race boat. Conceptualised by Lord Irvine Laidlaw and designed by Mark Mills, the boats are built in Cape Town, South Africa where there is a one-design fleet. A fleet has also grown in the UK, with a competitive one-design and IRC handicap racing circuit in The Solent. Boats have also been delivered to the US, Australia and Ireland.

Events

National Championships

National Series

Boats
Cape Town